The Peshawar–Dera Ismail Khan motorway is a  long proposed motorway connecting Peshawar with the southern parts of Khyber Pakhtunkhwa, Pakistan. Starting at the provincial capital Peshawar in the north, it will pass through Darra Adamkhel, Kohat, Hangu, Karak, Bannu, Ghoriwala, Lakki Marwat, and Darra Pezu, reaching Dera Ismail Khan at its southern end.

Passing through the three major Divisions of Khyber Pakhtunkhwa-Kohat, Bannu & D.I.Khan-by roads from the motorway will connect the cities of Kohat, Hangu, Karak, Bannu, Ghoriwala, Lakki Marwat, Tank and Dera Ismail Khan with the Kharlachi (D.I.Khan), Ghulam Khan (North Waziristan) and Angur Ada (South Waziristan) border crossings on the Durand Line-Afghanistan–Pakistan border to the west.

Details 
The project has two tunnels of  each. It is expected to be completed in a period of 4 years.

List of Interchages

 M1 Interchange 
 Tarnab Interchange
 Ring Road Interchange
 Matni-Badaber Interchange
 Dara Adam Khel Interchange
 Kohat Interchange
 Sher Kot-Asterzai Interchange
 Raeesan-Jozara Interchange
 Hangu-Tall Interchange
 Karapa-Lachi Interchange
 Soor Dag Interchange
 Bannu-Ghoriwala Interchange
 Sarai Naurang Gandi Interchange
 Gazni Khel-Lakki Marwat Interchange
 Pezo-Tank Interchange
 Yark Hakla-Islamabad Interchange
 DI Khan Interchange
 Zhob Quetta Interchange
 Darya Khan-DI Khan Interchange

The PC-1 of the project was approved in August 2021. In September 2021, it was approved from Executive Committee of the National Council with an estimated cost of Rs300 billion.

KP Government completed the feasibility study of the project in December 2022, and has entered into financing negotiations with Asian Development Bank (ADB) and the International Finance Cooperation (IFC) for loans covering 180 of the Rs. 300 billion required for the project. The remaining Rs. 120 billion are going to be contributed by the provincial government.

See also 

 Khyber Pakhtunkhwa
 Motorways of Pakistan
 Peshawar
 Dera Ismail Khan
 Bannu
 Ghoriwala
 China-Pakistan Economic Corridor

References 

AH1
Motorways in Pakistan